Supingstad is a town in Ngaka Modiri Molema District Municipality in the North West province of South Africa. It is the closest South African city to Gaborone.

References

Populated places in the Ramotshere Moiloa Local Municipality